Francis McDonald (1 January 1860 – 13 May 1938) was an Australian politician who was a member of the Legislative Assembly of Western Australia from 1901 to 1904, representing the seat of Cockburn Sound.

McDonald was born in Dunbeath, Caithness, Scotland, to Annie (née Grant) and James McDonald. After a period in New South Wales, he came to Western Australia in 1892, starting a business in Fremantle. McDonald was elected to the East Fremantle Municipal Council upon its formation in 1897, and served as mayor from 1900 to 1903. At the 1901 state election, he won the newly created seat of Cockburn Sound, which took in the area immediately south of Fremantle. The seat was abolished at the 1904 election, and later in the year McDonald purchased a farm at Beverley (in the Wheatbelt). He contested the seat of Beverley at the 1905 election, but was defeated by Edmund Smith. McDonald remained in Beverley for the rest of his life, dying there in May 1938 (aged 78).

See also
 List of mayors of East Fremantle

References

1860 births
1938 deaths
Mayors of places in Western Australia
Members of the Western Australian Legislative Assembly
People from Caithness
Scottish emigrants to colonial Australia
Western Australian local councillors